The 1952 Dutch Grand Prix was a Formula Two race held on 17 August 1952 at the Circuit Zandvoort. It was race 7 of 8 in the 1952 World Championship of Drivers, in which each Grand Prix was run to Formula Two rules rather than the Formula One regulations normally used. The 90-lap race was won by Ferrari driver Alberto Ascari after he started from pole position. His teammates Giuseppe Farina and Luigi Villoresi finished in second and third places. Ascari overtook Fangio's record for the most race wins, scoring his seventh at this race.

Race report  
 
Luigi Villoresi, absent from the World Championship since the final round of the 1951 season, returned to the Ferrari lineup for the Dutch Grand Prix, replacing Piero Taruffi, alongside regulars Nino Farina and Alberto Ascari, the latter of which had clinched the Drivers' Championship title two weeks previously. Charles de Tornaco also drove a Ferrari at Zandvoort, on behalf of the Ecurie Francorchamps team. Gordini entered the same three drivers from the previous event, the French trio of Behra, Manzon and Trintignant, while Belgian driver Paul Frère drove an Ecurie Belge-entered Simca-Gordini. The HWM team partnered Britons Lance Macklin and Duncan Hamilton with the local driver Dries van der Lof. The only other Dutch driver on the grid was Jan Flinterman, who took part in a Maserati for Escuderia Bandeirantes alongside Chico Landi and Gino Bianco. The works Maserati team were once again absent from the grid, following an unsuccessful appearance in Germany. The field was completed by the Connaught of Ken Downing, Mike Hawthorn's Cooper-Bristol, Ken Wharton's Frazer-Nash and Stirling Moss in an ERA.

The Ferraris once again dominated qualifying, with Ascari taking his fourth pole position of the season, ahead of Farina in second. Mike Hawthorn shone in practice, gaining a front-row start for his little Cooper-Bristol, relegating Villoresi's Ferrari to the second row of the grid. Trintignant's Gordini completed row two, while his teammates Behra and Manzon were joined on the third row by Wharton in the sole Frazer-Nash.

Hawthorn fought valiantly with the Ferraris for five laps before they resumed their usual formation. Ascari led Farina and Villoresi home in another Ferrari procession, with Hawthorn gaining fourth place, two laps behind the Ferrari trio. This was Ascari's fifth consecutive victory (along with a fifth consecutive fastest lap), and his seventh victory in total, breaking Fangio's record for the most World Championship race wins. The Gordinis of Manzon and Trintignant finished a further lap behind Hawthorn, taking fifth and sixth place, respectively. Stirling Moss got up as high as seventh in the ERA before having to retire.

Farina's podium finish took him to second place in the Drivers' Championship standings, overtaking the absentee Taruffi. Swiss driver Rudi Fischer, also not present at the Dutch Grand Prix, remained in fourth, while Mike Hawthorn's result took him to fifth in the standings, level on points with Fischer.

Entries

 — Paul Frère qualified and raced in the #14 Simca-Gordini. Johnny Claes, who was also entered in the same car, did not participate in the Grand Prix after being fired.
 — Chico Landi qualified and drove 43 laps of the race in the #16 Maserati. Jan Flinterman, whose own vehicle had already retired, took over the car for a further 40 laps of the race.
 — Gino Bianco qualified and raced in the #14 Simca-Gordini. Eitel Cantoni, who was also entered in the same car, did not participate in the Grand Prix after being fired.
 — Charles de Tornaco qualified and raced in the #24 Ferrari. Louis Rosier had initially entered the Grand Prix in a separate car bearing the same number, but later cancelled his entry.

Classification

Qualifying

Race

Notes
 – Includes 1 point for fastest lap

Shared drive 
 Car #16: Landi (43 laps) then Flinterman (40 laps)

Championship standings after the race 
Drivers' Championship standings

Note: Only the top five positions are included. Only the best 4 results counted towards the Championship. Numbers without parentheses are Championship points; numbers in parentheses are total points scored.

References

Dutch Grand Prix
Dutch Grand Prix
Grand Prix
Dutch Grand Prix